Park Jun-gyu (born June 27, 1964) is a South Korean actor. The son of acclaimed veteran actor Park No-sik, Park is best known for playing the role of Ssangkal in Rustic Period.

Filmography

Film

Quit Your Life (1971)
Zip Up (1972)
The Chameleon's Poem (1988)
Dangerous Passion (1989)
Tainted Rose '90 (1990)
Marijuana (1991)
A Small Autocratic Republic  (1991)
The Teen Rebellion  (1991)
The New Eight Province Men  (1991)
Do As You Please (1992)
The Man Who Always Takes the Last Train (1992)
A Winter Elegy (1992)
The Bikini Island Story (1992)
The Black Hat (1992)
Heartless Third Wharf (1993)
Jamon Jamon Seoul (1994)
Yellow Handkerchief (1995)
Karuna (1996)
Cue (1996)
Boss (1996)
Albatross (1996)
The Rocket Is Launched (1997)
Partner (1997)
The Last Attempt  (1998)
Blues (1998)
Jakarta (2000)
My Boss, My Hero (2001)
Four Toes (2002)
Sex of Magic (2002)
Sex Is Zero (2002)
My Wife Is a Gangster 2 (2003)
Wet Dreams 2 (2005)
The Art of Seduction (2005)
Oh! My God (2006)
The Fox Family (2006)
Hot for Teacher (2006)
Garden Balsam (short film, 2007)
Bravo My Life (2007)
Sweet Fish (2011)
A Year-End Medley (2021) – special appearance

Television series

그해 겨울은 따뜻했네 (KBS, 1988)
기쁨이면서 슬픔인 채로 (KBS, 1993)
Police (KBS, 1994)
Shooting (KBS, 1996)
A Faraway Country (KBS2, 1996)
Sprint (KBS, 1997)
Hong Gil-dong (SBS, 1998)
The Boss (MBC, 1998)
Medical Center (SBS, 2000)
Three Friends (MBC, 2001) (guest appearance)
Rustic Period (SBS, 2002)
Remember (MBC, 2002)
Age of Warriors (KBS1, 2003)
Damo (MBC, 2003)
Apgujeong House (SBS, 2003)
Jang Gil-san (SBS, 2004)
I Am Sam (KBS2, 2007)
Woman of Matchless Beauty, Park Jung-geum (MBC, 2008)
My Precious You (KBS2, 2008)
Marry Me, Mary! (KBS2, 2010)
Warrior Baek Dong-soo (SBS, 2011)
Lights and Shadows (MBC, 2011)
Arang and the Magistrate (MBC, 2012)
Marriage, Not Dating (tvN, 2014)
The Family Is Coming (SBS, 2015)
Kill Me, Heal Me (MBC, 2015)
The Rebel (MBC, 2017)
Return (SBS, 2018)
The Miracle We Met (KBS, 2018)
 Partners for Justice (MBC, 2018)

Variety show
Star Junior Show (SBS, 2009)
Hunters (SBS, 2009)
I Need a Family - Season 4 (MBC Every 1, 2010)
Brothers' Restaurant (SBSE!, 2010)
Hello Pot (KBS, 2011)
Truth Game (SBS, 2011)
Star King (SBS, 2012)
Top Gear Korea - Season 3 (XTM, 2012)
Family's Dignity: Full House (KBS, 2013)

Music video
Jang Hye-jin - "Let's Not Run Into Each Other Again"  (2009)

Theater
Guys and Dolls (1995)
Thanks Honey  (2009-2010)
Peonies Blooming in the Market  (2011)
Coyote Ugly (2011)
Running Man (Episode 90, 2012)
Luv (2012)
Roly-Poly (2012)
Guys and Dolls (2013-2014)
Five Course Love (2014)

Awards
2002 SBS Drama Awards: Best Supporting Actor (Rustic Period)
2002 25th Golden Cinematography Awards: Most Popular Actor (My Boss, My Hero)
2003 SBS Drama Awards: Excellence Award, Actor in a Sitcom (Apgujeong House)
2013 SBS Entertainment Awards: Best Entertainer (Star King)

References

External links
 Park Jun-gyu Fan Cafe at Daum 
 
 
 
 

1964 births
Living people
South Korean male film actors
South Korean male television actors
South Korean male stage actors
South Korean male musical theatre actors
South Korean television personalities
El Camino College alumni